Kanok-orn Bunma, (born September 8, 1952, in Chachoengsao, Thailand) is Miss Thailand 1972. she competed in Miss Universe 1973 pageant competition held in Athens.

On May 18, 1975, she married Suwit Pongjaruspan businessman and currently she work at gas station business in Nakhon Ratchasima.

References 

1952 births
Living people
Kanok-orn Bunma
Miss Universe 1973 contestants